An apostolic nunciature is a top-level diplomatic mission of the Holy See that is equivalent to an embassy. However, it neither issues visas nor has consulates.

The head of the apostolic nunciature is called a nuncio, an ecclesiastical diplomatic title. A papal nuncio (officially known as an Apostolic nuncio) is a permanent diplomatic representative (head of diplomatic mission) of the Holy See to a state or to one of two international intergovernmental organizations, the European Union or ASEAN, having the rank of an ambassador extraordinary and plenipotentiary, and the ecclesiastical rank of titular archbishop. Papal representatives to other intergovernmental organizations are known as "permanent observers" or "delegates".

In several countries that have diplomatic relations with the Holy See, the Apostolic Nuncio is ipso facto the Dean of the Diplomatic Corps. The nuncio is first in the order of precedence among all the diplomats accredited to the country, and he speaks for the diplomatic corps in matters of diplomatic privilege and protocol. Most countries that concede priority to the nuncio are officially Catholic, but some are not.

In addition, the nuncio serves as the liaison between the Holy See and the Church in that particular nation.  The nuncio has an important role in the selection of bishops.

List of diplomatic posts of the Holy See 

The Pope accredits diplomats with the following states and other subjects of international law (list as per January 2010):

Africa 
Algeria, Angola, Benin, Burkina Faso, Burundi, Botswana, Cameroon, Cape Verde, Central African Republic, Chad, Congo (Republic of), Congo (Democratic Republic of), Côte d'Ivoire, Djibouti, Egypt, Equatorial Guinea, Eritrea, Ethiopia, Gabon, Gambia, Ghana, Guinea, Guinea-Bissau, Kenya, Lesotho, Liberia, Libya, Madagascar, Malawi, Mali, Mauritius, Morocco, Mozambique, Namibia, Niger, Nigeria, Rwanda, São Tomé and Príncipe, Sénégal, Seychelles, Sierra Leone, South Africa, Sudan, Swaziland, Tanzania, Togo, Tunisia, Uganda, Zambia, Zimbabwe

The Americas 
Antigua and Barbuda, Argentina, Bahamas, Barbados, Belize, Bolivia, Brazil, Canada, Chile, Colombia, Costa Rica, Cuba, Dominica, Dominican Republic, Ecuador, El Salvador, Grenada, Guatemala, Guyana, Haiti, Honduras, Jamaica, México, Nicaragua, Panama, Paraguay, Peru, Saint Kitts and Nevis, Saint Lucia, Saint Vincent and Grenadines, Suriname, Trinidad and Tobago, United States of America, Uruguay, Venezuela

Asia 
Bahrain, Bangladesh, Cambodia, Republic of China (Taiwan), East Timor, India, Indonesia, Iran, Iraq, Israel, Japan, Jordan, Kazakhstan, Korea, Kuwait, Kyrgyzstan, Lebanon, Malaysia, Mongolia, Nepal, Pakistan, Philippines, Qatar, Singapore, Sri Lanka, Syria, Tajikistan, Thailand, Turkmenistan, United Arab Emirates, Uzbekistan, Vietnam (Non-Resident), Yemen.

Europe 
Albania, Andorra, Armenia, Austria,  Azerbaijan, Belarus, Belgium, Bosnia-Herzegovina, Bulgaria, Croatia, Cyprus, Czech Republic, Denmark, Estonia, European Union, Finland, France, Georgia, Germany, Great Britain, Greece, Hungary, Iceland, Ireland, Italy, Latvia, Liechtenstein, Lithuania, Luxembourg, Macedonia, Malta, Moldova, Monaco, Montenegro, the Netherlands, Norway, Poland, Portugal, Romania, Russia, San Marino, Serbia, Slovakia, Slovenia, Spain, Sweden, Switzerland, Turkey, Ukraine

Oceania 
Australia, the Cook Islands, Fiji, Guam, Kiribati, Marshall Islands, Micronesia (Federated States of), Nauru, New Zealand, Palau, Papua New Guinea, Samoa, Solomon Islands, Tonga, Vanuatu.

Special cases 
United Nations: the Holy See is represented by the Permanent Observer of the Holy See to the United Nations at the UN headquarters in New York and by the Permanent Observer at the UN's European office in Geneva, both of whom are titular archbishops.
Pacific Ocean: Countries of the Pacific Ocean are currently represented overall by the nuncio to New Zealand, who serves as the apostolic delegate in the Pacific Ocean.
Of entities that have established diplomatic relations with the Holy See, there is no representative accredited to the Order of Malta (which is also headquartered in Rome).
The Holy See does not have relations with fifteen countries:
Eight are Muslim: Afghanistan, Saudi Arabia, Brunei, Comoros,  the Maldives, Mauritania, Oman, and Somalia.
Four have communist governments: North Korea, Laos, China, and Vietnam.
The remaining three are Bhutan, Myanmar, and Tuvalu.

Delegations 
An Apostolic delegate may be sent to liaison between the Catholic Church and a country with which the Holy See has no diplomatic ties, though not accredited to the government of the country. Apostolic delegates have no formal diplomatic status, though in some countries they have some diplomatic privileges.

Africa:
Comoros, Mauritania, Somalia
Asia:
The Arabian Peninsula, Brunei, Laos, Myanmar, Vietnam
the Americas:
the Antilles (Anguilla, Antigua and Barbuda, Aruba, Bahamas, Barbados, Belize, Bermuda, British Virgin Islands, Cayman Islands, Dominica, French Guiana, Grenada, Guadeloupe, Guyana, Jamaica, Martinique, Montserrat, Netherlands Antilles, Saint Kitts and Nevis, Saint Lucia, Suriname, Trinidad and Tobago, Turks and Caicos Islands, Saint Vincent and Grenadines)
the Pacific Ocean

See also 

 Diplomacy of the Holy See
 Foreign relations of the Holy See
 Holy See and the United Nations
 Legal status of the Holy See
 List of diplomatic missions to the Holy See

References 

Holy See
Diplomacy